Léon Roller (5 January 1928 – 19 November 1993) was a Luxembourgian boxer. He competed in the men's welterweight event at the 1948 Summer Olympics. At the 1948 Summer Olympics, he received an opening-round bye before losing his first bout to Billy Boyce of Australia by decision in the Round of 16.

References

External links
 

1928 births
1993 deaths
Luxembourgian male boxers
Olympic boxers of Luxembourg
Boxers at the 1948 Summer Olympics
Sportspeople from Luxembourg City
Welterweight boxers